Epeus is a genus of the spider family Salticidae (jumping spiders). They are often found on broad-leaved plants or shrubs of rain forest, or in gardens of Southeast Asia.

The genus is similar to Plexippoides.

Description
Females are 7–9 mm long, males 6–9 mm. They are long-legged with a long opisthosoma, and quite colorful. Males have a characteristic v-shaped crest of raised, long hairs on the head, resembling a mohawk.

E. glorius, described in 1985, has a pale orange carapace with a deep orange crest of hairs. The three rear eye pairs have black surrounds with white squamose hairs, the opisthosoma is pale yellow. The four frontal legs of the male are brown with yellowish tarsi at the end, the other four legs are light brown. The legs of the female are pale yellow with black tips.

Distribution
Members of this genus are distributed throughout southern Asia.

Name
The generic name is derived from Epeius of Greek mythology.

Species
, the World Spider Catalog accepts the following species:
 Epeus alboguttatus (Thorell, 1887) – China, Myanmar, Vietnam
 Epeus albus Prószyński, 1992 – India
 Epeus bicuspidatus (Song, Gu & Chen, 1988) – China, Taiwan
 Epeus chilapataensis (Biswas & Biswas, 1992) – India
 Epeus daiqini Patoleta, Gardzińska & Żabka, 2020 – Thailand 
 Epeus edwardsi Barrion & Litsinger, 1995 – Philippines
 Epeus exdomus Jastrzebski, 2010 – Nepal
 Epeus flavobilineatus (Doleschall, 1859) – Java
 Epeus furcatus Zhang, Song & Li, 2003 – Singapore
 Epeus glorius Zabka, 1985 – China, Taiwan, Vietnam
 Epeus guangxi Peng & Li, 2002 – China, Taiwan
 Epeus hawigalboguttatus Barrion & Litsinger, 1995 – Philippines
 Epeus indicus Prószyński, 1992 – India
 Epeus mirus (Peckham & Peckham, 1907) – Borneo
 Epeus pallidus Patoleta, Gardzińska & Żabka, 2020 – Thailand
 Epeus sumatranus Prószyński & Deeleman-Reinhold, 2012 – Sumatra 
 Epeus szirakii Patoleta, Gardzińska & Żabka, 2020 – Thailand 
 Epeus tener (Simon, 1877) – Java
 Epeus triangulopalpis Malamel, Nafin, Sudhikumar & Sebastian, 2019 – India

Footnotes

References
 Murphy, F. & Murphy, J. (2000): An Introduction to the Spiders of South East Asia. Malaysian Nature Society, Kuala Lumpur.
 Zhang, J. X.; Song, D. X. & Li, D. (2003): Six new and one newly recorded species of Salticidae (Arachnida: Araneae) from Singapore and Malaysia. The Raffles Bulletin of Zoology 51(2):187-195. PDF (E. furcatus)

External links
 Salticidae.org: Diagnostic drawings and color photographs
 Photograph of E. flavobilineatus

Salticidae genera
Spiders of Asia
Salticidae